EBIT, Ebit or ebit may refer to:

EBIT, or Earnings before interest and taxes, in finance 
EBIT, or Electron beam ion trap, in physics
An ebit (quantum state), a two-party quantum state with quantum entanglement and the fundamental unit of bipartite entanglement
 Exabit, the symbol for the decimal unit of information storage